Yaquina is a place-name native to the U.S. state of Oregon.

Yaquina may refer to:

Yaquina people, a Native American tribe from Oregon
Yaquina Bay
Yaquina Bay Bridge
Yaquina Bay Light
Yaquina Bay State Recreation Site
Yaquina Head
Yaquina Head Light
Yaquina River
Yaquina, Oregon, an unincorporated area on the Yaquina Bay
USAV Yaquina, a hopper dredge ship of the U.S. Army Corps of engineers